A.O. Mod. TV. Vers. is the second studio album by Australian rock band Spy vs Spy, produced by Leszek Karski (Boys Next Door, Midnight Oil, Nauts) and released through WEA in December 1986.

The title is an abbreviation of 'Adults Only Modified Television Version' which used to appear at the bottom of late night movies in Australia at the time. The album peaked at No. 12 on the Kent Music Report and went gold. For this album Spy vs Spy recorded as v. Spy v. Spy, and the line-up was the original trio Craig Bloxom on bass guitar/lead vocals, Cliff Grigg on drums/percussion and Mike Weiley on lead guitar/vocals.

The album provided three singles – "Don't Tear it Down" inspired by the Department of Main Roads seeking to demolish the band's Darling Street squat, "Sallie-Anne" about murdered prostitute/whistleblower Sallie-Anne Huckstepp and "Credit Cards" a commentary on spiralling debt and consumerism. "Don't Tear It Down" was the band's most successful single, peaking at No. 31 on the Kent Music Report of the Australian singles charts in February 1987, it stayed in the charts for 20 weeks and went platinum.

Background
Spy vs Spy had formed in 1981 in Sydney as a ska/pub rock band. Their line-up was the trio Craig Bloxom on bass guitar/lead vocals, Cliff Grigg on drums/percussion and Mike Weiley on lead guitar/vocals. They became known for tackling political issues including racism, homelessness and contemporary drug culture. By 1984 they were using the name v. Spy v. Spy to avoid legal problems with Mad magazine. They were signed to Midnight Oil's label Powderworks and managed by Oils manager, Gary Morris. Their first full-length album Harry's Reasons was released in February 1986.

Spy vs Spy switched labels to WEA in 1986 and released the single "Don't Tear it Down" in November 1986.

Track listing
All tracks written by Craig Bloxom, Michael Weiley, Cliff Grigg and G Vasicek (aka Gary Morris).

Personnel
v. Spy v. Spy members
 Craig Bloxom – bass guitar, vocals
 Cliff Grigg – drums, percussion
 Michael Weiley – lead guitar

Recording details
Producer – Leszek Karski
Engineer – David Hemming
Mixer – Hemming, Karski
Studio – Alberts Studio, Sydney

Charts

Release history

References

1986 albums
Warner Music Australasia albums
Spy vs Spy (Australian band) albums